Sanogo is a surname.

It may refer to:

 Adama Sanogo (born 2002), Malian basketball player
 Amadou Sanogo (born 1972 or 1973), Malian military officer
 Boubacar Sanogo (born 1982), Ivorian footballer
 Moussa Sanogo (born 1983), Ivorian footballer
 Sekou Sanogo (1921–1962), Ivorian politician
 Sekou Sanogo Junior (born 1989), Ivorian footballer
 Yaya Sanogo (born 1993), French footballer